Elias Recaido (born May 15, 1970) is a retired boxer from the Philippines, who competed for his native country at the 1996 Summer Olympics in Atlanta, Georgia. There he was defeated in the quarterfinals of the Men's Flyweight (– 51 kg) division by Cuba's eventual gold medalist Maikro Romero (3:18). He won a bronze medal at the 1990 Asian Games.

References

External links
 

1970 births
Living people
Filipino male boxers
Flyweight boxers
Olympic boxers of the Philippines
Boxers at the 1996 Summer Olympics
Asian Games medalists in boxing
Asian Games gold medalists for the Philippines
Asian Games bronze medalists for the Philippines
Boxers at the 1990 Asian Games
Boxers at the 1994 Asian Games
Medalists at the 1990 Asian Games
Medalists at the 1994 Asian Games